Bezabeh is a surname. Notable people with the surname include:

Alemayehu Bezabeh (born  1986), Ethiopian athlete
Atre Bezabeh (born 1954), Ethiopian sprinter
Sisay Bezabeh (born 1977), Ethiopian-born Australian athlete
Tegegne Bezabeh (born 1941), Ethiopian sprinter

Amharic-language names